Mukundan Menon (born 19 July 1969) is an Indian actor who works in film, television, and stage. Mukundan is an alumnus of Thrissur School of Drama.

He has starred in several hit television projects, including Jwalayayi, Sthree, Pakalmazha and Charulatha which established him as a lead actor in the Malayalam television industry and later started doing films. He was best noted for his performance in the Mazhavil Manorama series Bhramanam.

Filmography 
Film

TV serials
Partial

References

External links 
 
 

Indian male film actors
Male actors in Malayalam cinema
21st-century Indian male actors
Living people
1969 births